Ernst Pühringer (born 6 August 1944) is an Austrian cross-country skier. He competed in the men's 15 kilometre event at the 1968 Winter Olympics.

References

1944 births
Living people
Austrian male cross-country skiers
Olympic cross-country skiers of Austria
Cross-country skiers at the 1968 Winter Olympics
Sportspeople from Upper Austria
People from Freistadt District
20th-century Austrian people